William Ireland may refer to:

William Ireland (Jesuit) (1636–1679), English Jesuit executed during the reign of King Charles II
William Henry Ireland (1775–1835), forger of would-be Shakespearean documents and plays
William M. Ireland (died 1891), co-founder of the National Grange of the Order of Patrons of Husbandry
William Henry Ireland (politician) (1884–?), Ontario merchant and political figure
William Ireland (tennis), Romanian tennis player
Bill Ireland, founder of the UNLV football program and later athletic director of UNLV